Abatocera subirregularis is a species of beetle in the family Cerambycidae. It was described by Breuning in 1954. It is known from the Celebes Islands.

References

Batocerini
Beetles described in 1954